Lasiophila is a butterfly genus from the subfamily Satyrinae in the family Nymphalidae found in South America.

Species

Listed alphabetically:
Lasiophila alkaios Tessmann, 1928
Lasiophila circe C. & R. Felder, 1859
Lasiophila ciris Thieme, 1907
Lasiophila cirta C. & R. Felder, 1859
Lasiophila hewitsonia Butler, 1868
Lasiophila orbifera Butler, 1868 – fiery satyr, obifera satyr
Lasiophila palades (Hewitson, 1872)
Lasiophila parthyene (Hewitson, 1872) – Partheyne satyr
Lasiophila phalaesia (Hewitson, 1868)
Lasiophila piscina Thieme, 1903 – piscina satyr, white-patched lasio
Lasiophila prosymna (Hewitson, 1857)
Lasiophila regia Staudinger, 1897
Lasiophila zapatoza (Westwood, [1851])

References

Satyrini
Nymphalidae of South America
Butterfly genera
Taxa named by Baron Cajetan von Felder
Taxa named by Rudolf Felder